The Muppets: An Original Walt Disney Records Soundtrack is a soundtrack album released by Walt Disney Records on November 22, 2011 for the musical comedy film The Muppets. The soundtrack features five original songs, four re-recordings and remasterings of popular Muppet songs ("The Muppet Show Theme", "Rainbow Connection", and "Mah Nà Mah Nà"), two cover versions of existing songs (Cee Lo Green's "Forget You" and Nirvana's "Smells Like Teen Spirit"), two standalone songs (Paul Simon's "Me and Julio Down by the Schoolyard" and Starship's "We Built This City"), and fifteen dialogue tracks. It also features the song "Man or Muppet", which won the Academy Award for Best Original Song. The soundtrack was also nominated for Best Compilation Soundtrack for Visual Media at the 55th Grammy Awards.

Songs not included in the album, but featured in the film include Gary Numan's "Cars", AC/DC's "Back in Black", George Thorogood's "Bad to the Bone", Jeff Moss' "Together Again" (from The Muppets Take Manhattan) and Bill Medley & Jennifer Warnes' "(I've Had) The Time of My Life".

A Spanish version of the soundtrack was released as Los Muppets: Banda Sonora Original de Walt Disney Records on December 6, 2011. The Spanish version received a nomination for Best Latin Children's Album at the 13th Latin Grammy Awards.

Track listing

Charts

Weekly charts

Year-end charts

The Muppets: Original Score

An album containing Christophe Beck's scores for The Muppets and Muppets Most Wanted was released by Intrada Records on April 28, 2014. The track listing below represents the album's section for The Muppets (tracks 25-47).

Personnel
Muppet performers
 Steve Whitmire – Kermit the Frog, Beaker, Statler, Rizzo the Rat, Link Hogthrob
 Eric Jacobson – Miss Piggy, Fozzie Bear, Animal, Sam Eagle, Marvin Suggs
 Dave Goelz – Gonzo, Dr. Bunsen Honeydew, Zoot, Beauregard, Waldorf, Kermit Moopet
 Bill Barretta – Rowlf the Dog, The Swedish Chef, Dr. Teeth, Pepé the King Prawn, Bobo the Bear, Muppet Gary
 David Rudman – Scooter, Janice, Miss Poogy, Wayne
 Matt Vogel – Floyd Pepper, Camilla the Chicken, Sweetums, '80s Robot, Lew Zealand, Uncle Deadly, Crazy Harry, Rowlf Moopet
 Peter Linz – Walter
 Jim Henson – Mahna Mahna (archival)
Frank Oz - Snowths (archival)

Production
Christophe Beck – composer
Bret McKenzie – composer, producer, music supervisor
Kaylin Frank – producer
Mitchell Leib – producer, executive in charge of music
James Bobin – executive producer
David Hoberman – executive producer
Todd Lieberman – executive producer
Peter Rotter – orchestra contractor
Jasper Randall – choir contractor

Orchestration
Tim Davies – conductor
Dave Metzger – score orchestration
Chris Caswell – orchestration
Zach Robinson – arranger, orchestration
Doug Walter – orchestration
Joanne Kane – music preparation
Booker White – music preparation

Technical
David Bianco – engineer, vocal engineer
David Boucher – engineer, vocal engineer
Mike Klein – engineer
 Brian Malouf – engineer, mixing
Rick Ruggieri – engineer, mixing
Casey Stone – engineer, mixing
Joseph Magee – engineer, mixing supervisor
Nick Wollage – engineer, vocal engineer
Ed Mitchell - vocal producer
Mickey Petralia – mixing
Patricia Sullivan – mastering
Richard Ford – score editor
Brett Pierce – music editor
Lisa Jaime – supervising music editor

Art
Steve Gerdes – art direction, design
Steve Sterling – art direction, design

References

2011 soundtrack albums
Disney film soundtracks
The Muppets albums
Walt Disney Records soundtracks
Musical film soundtracks
Comedy film soundtracks